A sex ratio is the ratio of males to females in a population. As explained by Fisher's principle, for evolutionary reasons this is typically about 1:1 in species which reproduce sexually. However, many species deviate from an even sex ratio, either periodically or permanently. Examples include parthenogenic species, periodically mating organisms such as aphids, some eusocial wasps, bees, ants, and termites.

The human sex ratio is of particular interest to anthropologists and demographers. In human societies, sex ratios at birth may be considerably skewed by factors such as the age of mother at birth and by sex-selective abortion and infanticide. Exposure to pesticides and other environmental contaminants may be a significant contributing factor as well. As of 2014, the global sex ratio at birth is estimated at 107 boys to 100 girls (1,000 boys per 934 girls)..

Types 
In most species, the sex ratio varies according to the age profile of the population.

It is generally divided into four subdivisions:

  — ratio at fertilization
  — ratio at birth
  — ratio in sexually mature organisms
The operational sex ratio (OSR) is the ratio of sexually active males to females in a population, and is therefore derived from a subset of the individuals included when calculating the ASR. Although conceptually distinct, researchers have sometimes equated the ASR with the OSR, particularly in experimental studies of animals where the difference between the two values may not always be readily apparent. 
  — ratio in post-reproductive organisms

These definitions can be somewhat subjective since they lack clear boundaries.

Sex ratio theory
Sex ratio theory is a field of academic study which seeks to understand the sex ratios observed in nature from an evolutionary perspective. It continues to be heavily influenced by the work of Eric Charnov. He defines five major questions, both for his book and the field in general (slightly abbreviated here):
For a dioecious species, what is the equilibrium sex ratio maintained by natural selection?
For a sequential hermaphrodite, what is the equilibrium sex order and time of sex change?
For a simultaneous hermaphrodite, what is the equilibrium allocation of resources to male versus female function in each breeding season?
Under what conditions are the various states of hermaphroditism or dioecy evolutionarily stable? When is a mixture of sexual types stable?
When does selection favour the ability of an individual to alter its allocation to male versus female function, in response to particular environmental or life history situations?

Biological research mostly concerns itself with sex allocation rather than sex ratio, sex allocation denoting the allocation of energy to either sex. Common research themes are the effects of local mate and resource competition (often abbreviated LMC and LRC, respectively).

Fisher's principle 

Fisher's principle (1930) explains why in most species, the sex ratio is approximately 1:1. His argument was summarised by W. D. Hamilton (1967) as follows, assuming that parents invest the same whether raising male or female offspring:

 Suppose male births are less common than female.
 A newborn male then has better mating prospects than a newborn female, and therefore can expect to have more offspring.
 Therefore parents genetically disposed to produce males tend to have more than average numbers of grandchildren born to them.
 Therefore the genes for male-producing tendencies spread, and male births become more common.
 As the 1:1 sex ratio is approached, the advantage associated with producing males dies away.
 The same reasoning holds if females are substituted for males throughout. Therefore 1:1 is the equilibrium ratio.

In modern language, the 1:1 ratio is the evolutionarily stable strategy (ESS). This ratio has been observed in many species, including the bee Macrotera portalis. A study performed by Danforth observed no significant difference in the number of males and females from the 1:1 sex ratio.

Examples in non-human species

Environmental and individual control
Spending equal amounts of resources to produce offspring of either sex is an evolutionarily stable strategy: if the general population deviates from this equilibrium by favoring one sex, one can obtain higher reproductive success with less effort by producing more of the other. For species where the cost of successfully raising one offspring is roughly the same regardless of its sex, this translates to an approximately equal sex ratio.

Bacteria of the genus Wolbachia cause skewed sex ratios in some arthropod species as they kill males. Sex-ratio of adult populations of pelagic copepods is usually skewed towards dominance of females. However, there are differences in adult sex ratios between families: in families in which females require multiple matings to keep producing eggs, sex ratios are less biased (close to 1); in families in which females can produce eggs continuously after only one mating, sex ratios are strongly skewed towards females.

Several species of reptiles have temperature-dependent sex determination, where incubation temperature of eggs determines the sex of the individual. In this method, however, all eggs in a clutch (20–50) will be of the same sex. In fact, the natural sex ratio of this species is five females to one male.

In birds, mothers can influence the sex of their chicks. In peafowl, maternal body condition can influence the proportion of daughters in the range from 25% to 87%.

In several groups of fish, such as wrasses, parrotfish and clownfish, dichogamy — or sequential hermaphroditism — is normal. This can cause a discrepancy in the sex ratios as well. In the bluestreak cleaner wrasse, there is only one male for every group of 6-8 females. If the male fish dies, the strongest female changes its sex to become the male for the group. All of these wrasses are born female, and only become male in this situation. Other species, like clownfish, do this in reverse, where all start out as non-reproductive males, and the largest male becomes a female, with the second-largest male maturing to become reproductive.

Domesticated animals
Traditionally, farmers have discovered that the most economically efficient community of animals will have a large number of females and a very small number of males. A herd of cows with a few bulls or a flock of hens with one rooster are the most economical sex ratios for domesticated livestock.

Dioecious plants secondary sex ratio and amount of pollen 
It was found that the amount of fertilizing pollen can influence secondary sex ratio in dioecious plants. Increase in pollen amount leads to decrease in number of male plants in the progeny. This relationship was confirmed on four plant species from three families – Rumex acetosa (Polygonaceae), Melandrium album (Caryophyllaceae), Cannabis sativa and Humulus japonicus (Cannabinaceae).

Polyandrous and cooperatively breeding homeotherms
In charadriiform birds, recent research has shown clearly that polyandry and sex-role reversal (where males care and females compete for mates) as found in phalaropes, jacanas, painted snipe and a few plover species is clearly related to a strongly male-biased adult sex ratio. Those species with male care and polyandry invariably have adult sex ratios with a large surplus of males, which in some cases can reach as high as six males per female.

Male-biased adult sex ratios have also been shown to correlate with cooperative breeding in mammals such as alpine marmots and wild canids. This correlation may also apply to cooperatively breeding birds, though the evidence is less clear. It is known, however, that both male-biased adult sex ratios and cooperative breeding tend to evolve where caring for offspring is extremely difficult due to low secondary productivity, as in Australia and Southern Africa. It is also known that in cooperative breeders where both sexes are philopatric like the varied sittella, adult sex ratios are equally or more male-biased than in those cooperative species, such as fairy-wrens, treecreepers and the noisy miner where females always disperse.

See also
Evolution of sex
Operational sex ratio
Sex allocation
Trivers–Willard hypothesis
XY sex-determination system

Humans:
Human sex ratio
List of countries by sex ratio
Bride kidnapping
Groom kidnapping
Demographic transition
Sex selection
Sex-selective abortion and infanticide
Youth bulge
Institutions:
 Gender Balance Council

Notes

References
 Also printed as 

Rath, R.M., and Mishra A.K. (2005). Techniques for Sex Ratio Analysis. Association of Professional Geographers.

External links 
 CIA listing of sex ratios for individual countries (including age divisions)
 A review of sex ratio theory

 
Population
Selection